Daniel 'Dani' José Rodríguez Vázquez (born 6 June 1988) is a Spanish professional footballer who plays for RCD Mallorca as a central midfielder.

Club career
Born in Betanzos, Province of A Coruña, Galicia, Rodríguez finished his youth career with Deportivo de La Coruña, and made his senior debuts with Betanzos CF in the 2007–08 season, in Tercera División and on loan. Subsequently returning to Dépor he was assigned to the reserves, in Segunda División B.

On 27 January 2010 Rodríguez appeared in his first game as a professional, playing the last 25 minutes of a 1–0 away win against Sevilla FC for the campaign's Copa del Rey. In August of the following year he joined UB Conquense, also in the third level.

On 24 July 2012 Rodríguez signed with Racing de Ferrol, in division four. After achieving promotion at the end of his first season, he renewed his link until 2015.

On 2 July 2015 Rodríguez moved to Racing de Santander also in the third level, after agreeing to a three-year deal. On 27 July of the following year he moved to fellow league team Albacete Balompié, being an undisputed starter as his side achieved promotion to Segunda División.

On 8 October 2017 Rodríguez scored his first professional goal, netting the winner through a penalty kick in a 2–1 home win against Lorca FC. The following 18 June, he signed a three-year contract with RCD Mallorca still in the second division, as a free agent.

Career statistics

Club

References

External links
 Profile at the RCD Mallorca website
 
 

1988 births
Living people
Spanish footballers
Footballers from Galicia (Spain)
People from Betanzos
Sportspeople from the Province of A Coruña
Association football midfielders
La Liga players
Segunda División players
Segunda División B players
Tercera División players
Deportivo Fabril players
UB Conquense footballers
Racing de Ferrol footballers
Racing de Santander players
Albacete Balompié players
RCD Mallorca players